Arnold Martin Schwartzman OBE is a British designer, author and film director known for his documentaries. In 1982, he won the Oscar for Best Documentary Feature, for his most famous work, Genocide. His other films are Liberation (1994) and Echoes That Remain (1991). He has designed advertisements for the Oscars for several years.

Schwartzman studied at Canterbury College of Art, now University for the Creative Arts, for which he has been a governor.

He is married to Isolde Schwartzman.

References

External links
 Arnold Schwartzman at IMDb

Living people
Alumni of the University for the Creative Arts
British documentary film directors
Officers of the Order of the British Empire
Directors of Best Documentary Feature Academy Award winners
Year of birth missing (living people)